Terence Hill (born Mario Girotti; 29 March 1939) is an Italian actor, film director, screenwriter and producer. He began his career as a child actor and gained international fame for starring roles in action and comedy films, many with longtime film partner and friend Bud Spencer. During the height of his popularity Hill was among Italy's highest-paid actors. 

His most widely seen films include comic and standard Spaghetti Westerns, some based on popular novels by German author Karl May about the Wild West. Of these, the most famous are Lo chiamavano Trinità (They Call Me Trinity, 1970); …continuavano a chiamarlo Trinità (Trinity Is Still My Name, 1971), the highest grossing Italian film to date; and Il mio nome è Nessuno (My Name Is Nobody, 1973), co-starring Henry Fonda. Hill, whose stage name was the product of a publicity stunt by film producers, also went on to a successful television career in Italy, playing the title character in the long-running Rai 1 series Don Matteo since 2000.

Early life
Hill was born on 29 March 1939 in Venice, Italy. Hill's mother, Hildegard Girotti (née Thieme), was German, from Dresden; his father, Girolamo Girotti, was Italian, and a chemist by occupation.

During his childhood, Hill lived in the small town of Lommatzsch, Saxony. He was there through the end of World War II (1943–1945) and survived the Bombing of Dresden.

Career

Child actor
He was discovered by Italian filmmaker Dino Risi at a swimming meet at the age of 12, and became a child actor, appearing in Risi's Vacation with a Gangster (1951) as Gianni the orphan gang leader. "They were looking for a boy gang leader and they found me," he later said.

He had small roles in Voice of Silence (1953) with Jean Marais, Too Young for Love (1953), and It Happened in the Park (1953), and had a particularly good part in Vacation with a Gangster (1953) with an imported star, Marc Lawrence.

He was in Golden Vein (1954) with Märta Torén and Richard Basehart, The Abandoned (1955) and Folgore Division (1955).

Leading man
Girotti had his first lead in Guaglione (1956). He could also be seen in Mamma sconosciuta (1956), I vagabondi delle stelle (1956), La grande strada azzurra (1956) with Yves Montand and Alida Valli, and Lazzarella (1957).

Girotti did Anna of Brooklyn (1958) with Gina Lollobrigida, The Sword and the Cross (1958) with Yvonne de Carlo (playing Lazarus of Bethany), and a TV version of The Picture of Dorian Gray (1958).

He had support parts in Il padrone delle ferriere (1959) with Virna Lisi, Juke box - Urli d'amore (1959), and Hannibal (1959) with Victor Mature and Carlo Pedersoli, who would later become known as Bud Spencer. Girotti had the lead roles in Spavaldi e innamorati (1959) and Cerasella (1959), a teen comedy.

It was back to support roles with Carthage in Flames (1960), Un militare e mezzo (1960), and The Story of Joseph and His Brethren (1961) with Geoffrey Horne and Robert Morley, directed by Irving Rapper.

Girotti had support parts in The Wonders of Aladdin (1961) with Donald O'Connor and directed by Henry Levin and Mario Bava, Pecado de amor (1961), Seven Seas to Calais (1962) with Rod Taylor, and The Shortest Day (1963).

Girotti secured a substantial supporting role in Luchino Visconti's film epic The Leopard (1963) alongside Burt Lancaster and Alain Delon, in which he unsuccessfully tries to court the daughter of Lancaster's character. During this time he studied classical literature for three years at an Italian university.

Germany
In 1964, he returned to Germany and there appeared in a series of Heimatfilme, adventure and western films, based on novels by German author Karl May. These included Last of the Renegades (1964) with Lex Barker; three films with Stewart Granger, Amongst Vultures (1964), The Oil Prince (1965) and Old Surehand (1965); Shots in 3/4 Time (1965); Duel at Sundown (1965) with Peter Van Eyck; Call of the Forest (1965), an Austrian movie; Die Nibelungen, Teil 1 - Siegfried (1965) and Die Nibelungen, Teil 2 - Kriemhilds Rache (1967).

In 1967, he returned to Italy to make Io non protesto, io amo (1967), co starring Caterina Caselli.

Bud Spencer

Girotti then appeared alongside Bud Spencer (then known as Carlo Pedersoli) in Giuseppe Colizzi's Spaghetti Western God Forgives... I Don't! (1967). At the time cast and crew in Westerns frequently adopted American names to give the film a better chance of selling in non-Italian speaking countries; Girotti changed his name to "Terence Hill". He took "Hill" from his wife's mother's name and "Terence" from a book on Roman poets. The film was a huge hit – the most popular film of the year in Italy – and established him as a star.

Hill followed it with a musicarello, The Crazy Kids of the War (1967) with Rita Pavone, then did a Western, Django, Prepare a Coffin (1968) for director Ferdinando Baldi, a sequel to Django (1966) with Hill playing the role done by Franco Nero in the original; it co-starred Horst Frank and George Eastman (and would be featured, much later, at the 64th Venice Film Festival, in 2007).

Hill was a leading man in a musical Western Crazy Westerners (1968), again with Rita Pavone, then was reunited with Spencer in Ace High (1968), a sequel to God Forgives with a cast including several American actors such as Eli Wallach. Hill did The Tough and the Mighty (1968), a biopic of Graziano Mesina, then a second sequel to God Forgives, Boot Hill (1969), co-starring Spencer and Woody Strode.

Hill did The Wind's Fierce (1970) then had a huge hit with Spencer with the comedy Western They Call Me Trinity (1971). Hill did a swashbuckler, Blackie the Pirate (1971), in which Spencer had a small role; they reteamed properly for a Trinity sequel, Trinity Is Still My Name (1972). It was even more popular than the original and had a successful release in the USA.

Hill did a modern-day crime drama The Hassled Hooker (1972) and a comedy Western without Spencer, Man of the East (1972). He and Spencer did ... All the Way, Boys! (1972), their first non-Western though it was still a comic adventure film.

International films
Hill has stated in interviews that My Name Is Nobody (1973), in which he co-starred with Henry Fonda, is his personal favorite of all his films. The film was based on an idea for Sergio Leone.

Hill again starred with Spencer in Watch Out, We're Mad (1974) and Two Missionaries (1974) then without him in the spaghetti Western A Genius, Two Partners and a Dupe (1975). He moved from Italy to live in the US and settled in Stockbridge, Massachusetts, in the Berkshires.

Dino De Laurentiis cast Hill in his first English-language film, Mr. Billion (1977), directed by Jonathan Kaplan for 20th Century Fox, co-starring Valerie Perrine and Jackie Gleason. It was a box office flop.

After returning to Italy for Crime Busters (1977) with Spencer, Hill then made another English-language movie, March or Die (1977), an $8 million French Foreign Legion tale for Lew Grade, co starring Gene Hackman and Catherine Deneuve. It was a box office disappointment.

Despite his fluency in Italian and English, Hill was usually dubbed by other actors in both languages. In the Italian versions of his films, various actors provided his voice until the late 1960s, where he was primarily dubbed by Sergio Graziani; he was voiced by Pino Locchi from 1970 to 1983, and by Michele Gammino from 1983 to 1996. For English dubs, Lloyd Battista dubbed him in six films, including the "Cat Stevens and Hutch Bessy" trilogy, while Roger Browne dubbed him in most of his early 1970s films (They Call Me Trinity to A Genius, Two Partners and a Dupe); from Mr. Billion onward, Hill dubbed his own English voice.

Hill and Spencer starred in Odds and Evens (1978), I'm for the Hippopotamus (1979), Who Finds a Friend Finds a Treasure (1981), and Go for It (1983). Without Spencer, Hill made Org (1979), which he also produced, and Super Fuzz (1980).

Director
Hill did The World of Don Camillo (1984), which he also produced and directed. He teamed with Spencer for Double Trouble (1984), and Miami Supercops (1985), then did They Call Me Renegade (1987), based on a story by Hill.

Television
Hill turned director for Lucky Luke (1991) in which he starred and that was shot in the United States; it led to a TV series of the same name.

He reunited with Spencer one last time for Troublemakers (1994) which Hill also directed. He did Virtual Weapon (1997) with Marvelous Marvin Hagler.

In 2000, he landed the leading role in the Italian television series Don Matteo (2000–present), about an inspirational parish priest who assists the Carabinieri in solving crimes local to his community. This role earned Hill an international "Outstanding Actor of the Year" award at the 42nd Monte Carlo Television Festival, alongside ones for the series, and for producer Alessandro Jacchia at that festival.

During the series' run he appeared in TV movies L'uomo che sognava con le aquile (2009), Riding the Dark (2009), Doc West (2009), and Triggerman (2009); he co-directed the last two.

In the summer of 2010, Hill filmed another Italian television series for the Italian state television channel Rai Uno, this time entitled Un passo dal cielo (One Step from Heaven), playing a local chief of the state foresters in the region of Alto Adige, with a second season filmed in 2012.

On 19 April 2018 he directed My Name Is Thomas, which he also appeared in. The same year, the co-op beat 'em up videogame Bud Spencer & Terence Hill: Slaps and Beans was released.

Personal life
Hill is married to Lori Hill (née Zwicklbauer). He has two sons, Jess (born 1969) and Ross (1973–1990). Ross was killed in a car accident in Stockbridge, Massachusetts, in 1990, while Terence was preparing to film Lucky Luke (1991) on the Bonanza Creek Ranch near Santa Fe, New Mexico. He holds American citizenship, and in November 2022 he also attained a German citizenship by descent from the German consulate-general in Los Angeles without requiring a naturalization test.

Filmography

Film

Television

Video games

Music Video

References

External links

 
 

1939 births
20th-century Italian male actors
21st-century Italian male actors
Actors from Venice
David di Donatello Career Award winners
Film people from Venice
People from the Province of Terni
People with acquired American citizenship
Italian expatriates in Germany
Italian expatriates in the United States
Italian film directors
Italian male child actors
Italian male film actors
Italian male television actors
Italian people of German descent
Italian television directors
Living people
Male Spaghetti Western actors
Male Western (genre) film actors
Terence Hill and Bud Spencer